The Aare or Aar is a tributary of the High Rhine and the longest river that both rises and ends entirely within Switzerland.

There are more than 40 hydroelectric plants along the course of the Aare.

The river's name dates to at least the La Tène period, and it is attested as Nantaror "Aare valley" in the Berne zinc tablet.

The name was Latinized as Arula/Arola/Araris.

Course

The Aare rises in the great Aargletschers (Aare Glaciers) of the Bernese Alps, in the canton of Bern and west of the Grimsel Pass. The Finsteraargletscher and Lauteraargletscher come together to form the Unteraargletscher (Lower Aar Glacier), which is the main source of water for the Grimselsee (Lake of Grimsel). The Oberaargletscher (Upper Aar Glacier) feeds the Oberaarsee, which also flows into the Grimselsee. The Aare leaves the Grimselsee just to the east to the Grimsel Hospiz, below the Grimsel Pass, and then flows northwest through the Haslital, forming on the way the magnificent Handegg Waterfall, past Guttannen.

Right after Innertkirchen it is joined by its first major tributary, the Gamderwasser. Less than  later the river carves through a limestone ridge in the Aare Gorge. It is here that the Aare proves itself to be more than just a river, as it attracts thousands of tourists annually to the causeways through the gorge. A little past Meiringen, near Brienz, the river expands into Lake Brienz. Near the west end of the lake it indirectly receives its first important tributary, the Lütschine, by the Lake of Brienz. It then runs across the swampy plain of the Bödeli (Swiss German diminutive for ground) between Interlaken and Unterseen before flowing into Lake Thun.

Near the west end of Lake Thun, the river indirectly receives the waters of the Kander, which has just been joined by the Simme, by the Lake of Thun. Lake Thun marks the head of navigation. On flowing out of the lake it passes through Thun, and then flows through the city of Bern, passing beneath eighteen bridges and around the steeply-flanked peninsula on which the Old City is located. River swimming in the Aare is popular in Bern, and the river is sometimes full of bathers on summer days. The river soon changes its northwesterly flow for a due westerly direction, but after receiving the Saane or La Sarine it turns north until it nears Aarberg. There, in one of the major Swiss engineering feats of the 19th century, the Jura water correction, the river, which had previously rendered the countryside north of Bern a swampland through frequent flooding, was diverted by the Aare-Hagneck Canal into the Lac de Bienne. From the upper end of the lake, at Nidau, the river issues through the Nidau-Büren Canal, also called the Aare Canal, and then runs east to Büren. The lake absorbs huge amounts of eroded gravel and snowmelt that the river brings from the Alps, and the former swamps have become fruitful plains: they are known as the "vegetable garden of Switzerland".

From here the Aare flows northeast for a long distance, past the ambassador town Solothurn (below which the Grosse Emme flows in on the right), Aarburg (where it is joined by the Wigger), Olten, Aarau, near which is the junction with the Suhre, and Wildegg, where the Seetal Aabach falls in on the right. A short distance further, below Brugg, it receives first the Reuss, its major tributary, and shortly afterwards the Limmat, its second strongest tributary. It now turns due north, and soon becomes itself a tributary of the Rhine, which it even surpasses in volume when the two rivers unite downstream from Koblenz (Switzerland), opposite Waldshut in Germany. The Rhine, in turn, empties into the North Sea after crossing into the Netherlands.

Tributaries 

Limmat (after and northeast of Brugg, and northwest of Baden)
Reppisch
Sihl
Alp
Minster
Lake Zurich
Linthkanal
Lake Walen
Linth
Löntsch
Sernf
Flätschbach
Seez
Reuss (after and northeast of Brugg, and northwest of Baden)
Lorze
Kleine Emme
Lake Lucerne
Sarner Aa
Engelberger Aa
Muota
Schächen
Chärstelenbach
Göschener Reuss
Aabach (coming from Seetal, in Wildegg)
Bünz
Suhre (after and north of Aarau)
Wyna
Aabach (from the left in Aarau)
Stegbach
Dünnern (in Olten)
Wigger (right before Aarburg)
Murg (before, west of Murgenthal)
Rot (Roggwil)
Langete (Langenthal)
Ursenbach (Kleindietwil)
Rotbach (Huttwil)
(Grosse) Emme (after, east of Solothurn)
Lake of Bienne
La Suze (in Biel/Bienne, right next to the outflow)
Zihlkanal
Lake of Neuchatel
La Broye (flows through Lake Morat)
Zihl/La Thielle
L'Orbe
Le Talent
Saane/La Sarine (after, west of Wohlensee)
Sense
Gürbe (in Muri bei Bern)
Zulg (west of Steffisburg)
Lake Thun
Kander (west of Spiez)
Simme
Entschlige
Lake Brienz
Lütschine (at the end of Lake Brienz, right next to the outflow)
Gadmerwasser (right after, northwest of Innertkirchen)

Reservoirs
 Lake Grimsel, 
 Lake Brienz, 
 Lake Thun, 
 Lake Wohlen, 
 Niederriedsee, 
 Lake Biel, 
 Klingnauer Stausee,

Notes

Footnotes

References

External links

 The Aare Gorge (Aareschlucht)

 
Rivers of Switzerland
 
Rivers of the canton of Bern
Rivers of Aargau
Water transport in Switzerland
Rivers of the Alps